This article displays the qualifying draw for the women's singles event at the 2001 Australian Open.

Players

Seeds

  Allison Bradshaw (second round)
  Andrea Glass (Qualifier)
  Lina Krasnoroutskaya (Qualifier)
  Cătălina Cristea (second round)
  Dawn Buth (first round)
  Ľudmila Cervanová (final round)
  Katarina Srebotnik (final round)
  Bianka Lamade (final round)
  Yuka Yoshida (final round)
  Sandra Kleinová (second round)
  Sandra Cacic (first round)
  Laurence Courtois (first round)
  Elena Bovina (Qualifier)
  Li Na (first round)
  Anca Barna (Qualifier)
  Nuria Llagostera (Qualifier)
  Milagros Sequera (final round)
  Jill Craybas (Qualifier)
  Alexandra Fusai (Qualifier)
  Gréta Arn (Qualifier)
  Angelika Bachmann (second round)
  Janette Husárová (Qualifier)
  Alena Vašková (first round)
  María José Martínez (Qualifier)

Qualifiers

  Alexandra Fusai
  Andrea Glass
  Lina Krasnoroutskaya
  Maja Palaveršić
  María José Martínez
  Anca Barna
  Nuria Llagostera
  Elena Bovina
  Jill Craybas
  Gréta Arn
  Laurence Andretto
  Janette Husárová

Qualifying draw

First qualifier

Second qualifier

Third qualifier

Fourth qualifier

Fifth qualifier

Sixth qualifier

Seventh qualifier

Eighth qualifier

Ninth qualifier

Tenth qualifier

Eleventh qualifier

Twelfth qualifier

References
 2001 Australian Open Women's Qualifying Draw
 2001 Australian Open – Women's draws and results at the International Tennis Federation

Women's Singles Qualifying
Australian Open (tennis) by year – Qualifying